Mount Kokeby is a small town in the Wheatbelt region of Western Australia, about  south of the town of Beverley towards Brookton.

History
The town name is the product of a misspelling of Rokeby (after Henry Montagu, the 6th Baron Rokeby of Armagh, after whom Rokeby Road in Subiaco is also named). The nearby Mount Rokeby was named by John Septimus Roe in 1835, but when a station on the Great Southern Railway was opened in 1889, it was incorrectly spelt Mount Kokeby. The name stuck and the nearby hill's name was changed in 1950.

In 1899 the government land agent in Beverley suggested blocks of land be made available adjacent to the station, and following survey a townsite was gazetted here in 1902. An agricultural hall was built, but has since been demolished. The locality is predominantly used for wheat and sheep farming. The town is a receival site for Cooperative Bulk Handling.

References

Towns in Western Australia
Wheatbelt (Western Australia)
Grain receival points of Western Australia